Kani Eshkut (also Romanized as Kānī Eshkūt) is a village in Mangur-e Gharbi Rural District, in the Central District of Piranshahr County, West Azerbaijan Province, Iran. At the 2006 census, its population was 253, in 38 families.

References 

Populated places in Piranshahr County